John 20:10 is the tenth verse of the twentieth chapter of the Gospel of John. Peter and the Beloved Disciple have just finished examining the empty tomb of Jesus, and in this verse they return home.

Content
In the King James Version of the Bible the text reads:
Then the disciples went away 
again unto their own home.

The English Standard Version translates the passage as:
Then the disciples went back to their homes.

For a collection of other versions see BibleHub John 20:10

Analysis
 describes this same scene, but it adds that on the trip home Peter was "wondering what had happened". John does not make clear what is in the minds of the disciples, and some read John 20:8 as meaning that one or more of the pair had been convinced of the resurrection.

According to Brown most scholars believe the home that the disciples depart for is not their actual home in Galilee, but rather where they had been staying in Jerusalem, although Luke seemingly indicates that some of the disciples were traveling home after the crucifixion and it is not impossible that Peter and the Beloved Disciple were embarking on the long journey.

As it is indicated in John 20:2 that Peter and the Beloved Disciple were found separately by Mary Magdalene it is also often assumed that Peter and the other disciple returned to separate areas. They will be together again that evening when Jesus appears to the ten disciples at John 20:19. The departure of the two disciples allowed Mary to meet Jesus alone (verses 11–18).

References

Sources

Further reading
John Calvin's commentary on John 20:10-15
Jesus Appears to His Disciples

20:10